The São Bartolomeu River Basin Environmental Protection Area is a protected area in the Federal District, Brazil.

Location

The environmental protected area contains samples of the Cerrado biome.
It was created on 7 November 1983 and is administered by the Chico Mendes Institute for Biodiversity Conservation.
The environmental protected area has territory distributed over the administrative regions of São Sebastião, Jardim Botânico, Paranoá, Itapoã, Sobradinho and Planaltina, in the Federal District.

Conservation

The area is IUCN protected area category V (protected landscape/seascape).
The purpose is to protect biological diversity, control human occupation and ensure sustainable use of natural resources.
The area is an important corridor between the Águas Emendadas Ecological Station and the protected environment areas of Cafuringa, Lago Paranoá and the Gama and Cabeça-de-Veado basins.
It contains all types of vegetation from the cerrado and the campos rupestres.
Fauna include various specimens of native wildlife.

Notes

Sources

Environmental protection areas of Brazil
Protected areas of Federal District (Brazil)